Alberto Hemsi (27 June 1898 – 8 October 1975) was a composer of the 20th century classical era. His work in the field of ethnomusicology and integration of Sephardic melodies has been noted as parallel to Béla Bartók's collection of traditional Hungarian music and consequent integration to his music.

Life

Family and early years

Hemsi was born in 1898 in Turgutlu in the Ottoman Empire, Alberto Hemsi's family roots can be traced back to the Sephardic Jews of the Iberian peninsula.  From an early age, Alberto's parents detected a keen sensitivity and interest in music, especially during prayers sung in synagogue, and decided to send him to stay with his uncle in Smyrne (now Izmir). Hemsi studied at the school of the Alliance Israélite Universelle (A.I.U.) from 1908 - 1913.  At the A.I.U., he studied flute, trombone, cornet, and the clarinet, but his true passions were for the piano  and for composition.

1913-1919: Conservatorio di Musica Giuseppe Verdi

In 1913, at the insistence of the director of the A.I.U., Hemsi moved to Italy after receiving a scholarship to study at the Conservatorio Royal di Milano.  At the conservatorio, Hemsi was taught by internationally acclaimed professors such as Bossi Pirinello (composition, harmony, and counterpoint), Galli (orchestration), Pozzoli Delochi (theory and solfeggio), and Giusto Zampieri (music history).  During his studies, Alberto Hemsi asked his music history professor about Jewish music.  The response given was that although Jewish music is important, he could not recall any melodies because few existed.  Perplexed and sceptical of this response, largely due to his exposure to many Jewish melodies in childhood, Hemsi proceeded to ask the cantor of his synagogue back in Cassaba / Turgutlu  for more information about traditional Jewish melodies.

1919-1957: Ethnomusicology and integration of Jewish melodies

After returning from Italy to his homeland, Hemsi followed in the folkloric footsteps of Bartók and Constantin Brăiloiu.  He focuses on the Hispano-Judeaic traditional music of his ancestors.  The traditional Hispano-Judeaic melodies were transmitted orally for generations by the women of the communities and infused with the medieval Spanish literature.  Hemsi proceeded to dedicate more than 17 years of his life to collect traditional chants throughout the former Ottoman Empire, particularly in Smyrne, Salonica or Thessaloniki, Rhodes, Istanbul, and Alexandria.  At the end of these travels, Hemsi wrote out harmonizations for piano of sixty traditional melodies.  This work was the first of the ten books known as "Coplas Sefardies."

Harmonization of the traditional Sephardic chants proved to be a challenge since the harmonization of monodic modal chants is not possible in a tonal sense.  Hemsi did not wish to alter the traditional melodies nor utilise modern harmonic techniques of the epoch.

In addition to the Coplas Sefardies, Hemsi composed numerous other works for a variety of ensembles including orchestra, string quintets, choir, cello, and piano.  He drew inspiration equally from liturgical music of the synagogue as well as music from Egypt, Turkey, and Greece.

1957-1976: Paris

On August 22, 1957, the Hemsi family moved to Paris to escape the political agitation in Egypt.  Compositional output at this time began to slow as Hemsi adjusted to the Parisian lifestyle.  He found work as music director in synagogues as well as a solfeggio teacher for Sephardic liturgy at the École Cantoriale du Séminaire Israélite de France (S.I.F.)  Hemsi continued to travel regularly to spread his musical compositions until later in his life, when his health began to degrade.  He died of lung cancer in Paris in October 1975.

Works, editions and recordings
 Coplas Sefardies – collection of sephardic songs composed by Hemsi from among 230 poems and songs collected in the former Ottoman Empire between 1923 and 1937. Pedro Aledo (voice), Ludovic Amadeus Selmi (piano). Patrimoines Musicaux des Juifs de France Vol. 4
 Coplas Sefardies, CD. Mira Zakai, alto, Menachem Wiesenberg, piano. Beth Hatefutsoth, Museum of the Jewish Diaspora, 1990, BTR 9002
 Coplas Sefardies (complete art-song recording), Vol. 1: cycle 1–4 (No. 1–24); Vol. 2: cycle 5-7 (No. 1-18), Kal Nidrey Op. 12, Four Songs Op. 42, Visions Bibliques Op. 48.1-3. Cantor Assaf Levitin, bass-baritone and Naaman Wagner, piano. Rondeau Production, 2018, ROP6155 and ROP6156
 Coplas Sefardies (complete recording of the original version), Vol. 1: No. 1-18, Vol. 2: No. 19-42, Vol 3: No. 43-60, Five Hebrew Songs Op. 25, Yom gila yavo, yavo! Op. 17. Tehila Nini Goldstein (soprano), Jascha Nemtsov (piano). Hänssler Classic, 2020, HC20039

References

Further reading

 Mechoulan, Henry (1992) Les Juifs d'Espagne histoire d'une diaspora 1492-1992, Liana Levi, Paris.
 Hemsi, Alberto (1924) La Musique traditionnelle chez les juifs sefardim d'Orient, Hamernora, Constantinople, Organe du Bene Berith du District d'Orient.
 Hemsi, Alberto (1974) SEPHARAD ou d'une Espagne méconnue, Paris.
 Adonay, Santo (1959) Judaïsme Sepharadi, Organe mensuel de l'union universelle des communautés séphardites, Paris.
 Benbassa, Esther and Aron, Rodrique, (2002) Hisoire des Juifs sépharades de Tolède à salonique, Paris, Du Seuil.
 Hemsi, Alberto (1929) La Musique Orientale en Egypte, Études et Polémiques, Alexandria, Edition orientale de Musique.
 Séroussi, Edwin, Díaz-Mas, Paloma, Pedrosa, José Manuel, and Romero, Elena (1995) Alberto Hemsi Cancionero sefardî, Jerusalem.
 Roda, Jessica (2007) Alberto Hemsi et les Coplas Sefardies. Analyse musicologique d’une oeuvre inspirée de la musique judéo-espagnole“, master theses, Université Paris-Sorbonne (unpublished).
 Roda, Jessica (2018) Se réinventer au présent. Les Judéo-espagnols de France. Famille, communauté et patrimoine musical. Presses universitaires de Rennes. 

1898 births
1975 deaths
Turkish composers
Turkish Jews
Composers for piano
Jewish composers
20th-century classical composers
Ethnomusicologists
Milan Conservatory alumni
People from Turgutlu
Male classical composers
20th-century musicologists
20th-century male musicians